Jimmy, the Boy Wonder is a 1966 children's musical film about a boy, played by Dennis Jones, who successfully stops time. The film is one of two children's features directed by Herschell Gordon Lewis, the other being The Magic Land of Mother Goose, who is better known for his gory splatter films. It was described as a "glorious bomb" by the Scarecrow Video Movie Guide.

Plot
Jimmy is a young boy who is tired of the drudgery of his daily routine. One morning, Jimmy shouts out, "I wish time would stop!" Somehow, his wish gets heard by the so-called "master clock", and everyone (except Jimmy) is frozen in their tracks. Observing this catastrophe is a magical astronomer, who sends his daughter Aurora to talk Jimmy into helping her undo the damage before the time freeze becomes permanent. As Jimmy and Aurora travel to a region called the World's End so that Jimmy can replace the magical Golden Globe in the master clock to set time running again, they are hounded by an evil wizard known as Mr. Fig, who seizes the chance to take over the world for himself. Jimmy and Aurora's travels take them through various places which include "slow motion playground", "night and day land", encounters with green-skinned Indians calling for rain, etc. all the while with Mr. Fig trying to stop them at nearly every turn on their mission.

Production
The film was shot entirely in Florida in and around Coral Gables. The Coral Castle was used as the backdrop for both the Astronomer's home as well as the coral maze of the World's End at the film's climax.

Critical reception 
Allmovie panned the film, writing "Jimmy, the Boy Wonder is crafted as crudely as anything from this director's oeuvre, resulting in a crass, slapdash kid pic that undoubtedly led to restlessness and boredom in children and angry parents at the box office arguing about refunds."

References

External links 
 

1966 films
Films directed by Herschell Gordon Lewis
American children's films
Films set in Coral Gables, Florida
1960s English-language films
1960s American films